Platybelone is a genus of needlefish from the family Belonidae.

Species
The following two species are currently recognised:

Platybelone argalus (Lesueur, 1821)
Platybelone lovii (Günther, 1866)

References

 
Belonidae
Ray-finned fish genera